Airtel Delhi Half Marathon (ADHM) is an annual half marathon foot-race held in New Delhi, India. Established in 2005, it is both an elite runner and mass participation event. It is an AIMS-certified course and is listed as a Gold Label Road Race by the IAAF. The race has seen the best of the athletes competing since the course is considered one of the fastest half marathon route. The event sees about 40,000 participants through the race categories of half marathon, the 7 km Great Delhi Run, a 4.3 km run for senior citizens, and a 3.5 km wheelchair race

Course

The course starts in the Nehru Stadium, although this was temporarily moved to the grounds of the Secretariat Building while the stadium was under renovation for the 2010 Commonwealth Games. The race is largely flat and has delivered fast winning times in its short history, with men producing a number of sub-one hour times and women recording times under 1:08:00.

Sponsor
The race was sponsored Hutchison Essar for its first two races, and the company sponsored the event as Vodafone Essar in 2007 following a takeover. Rival communications company Airtel holds the sponsor role since 2008.

Prize
The half marathon is the elite runner race, while the Great Delhi Run attracts the majority of participants overall. The inaugural edition in 2005 had total prize money of US$310,000. The prize for the winners of the men's and women's race was $25,000 dollars in 2009 and $27,000 in 2015.

Past winners
Key:

Sponsors/partners 
 Title sponsor: Airtel
 Channel partner: Star Sports
 Driven by: S-Cross
 Retail Partner: Jabong
 Ignited by: Puma
 Timing partner: Seiko
 Nutrition partner: Nestlé
 Hospitality partner: Le Meridein
 Medical partner: Max Healthcare
 Print partner: The Times of India
 Radio partner: Radio Mirchi
 Philanthropy partner: India Cares
 Institution partner: Harmony for Silvers Foundation
 Supported by: Government of Delhi
 Under the aegis of: Athletics Federation of India
 Certified by: AIMS
 Champions With Disability Facilitator: Planet Abled

References

External links
Official website

Recurring sporting events established in 2005
Half marathons
Athletics in New Delhi
Athletics competitions in India
2005 establishments in Delhi
Sports competitions in Delhi